List of fellows and Residents of the American Academy in Rome is a list of those who have been awarded the Rome Prize or were residents of the American Academy in Rome.

The Rome Prize is a prestigious American award made annually by the American Academy in Rome, through a nationwide competition, to 15 emerging artists (working in architecture, landscape architecture, design, historic preservation and conservation, literature, musical composition, or visual arts) and to 15 scholars (working in ancient, medieval, renaissance and early modern, or modern Italian studies). Residents are selected from scholars and creative artists at a further stages in their career for shorter residencies at the American Academy. Some of these residents are marked (R) in the table below. Affiliated fellows (AFAAR) and visiting artists and scholars are not listed below.

Fellows and residents of the American Academy in Rome

References

Society of Fellows, American Academy in Rome, Member Directory

External links
 American Academy in Rome, official website of the Academy
 American Academy in Rome

American awards
Arts awards
Architecture awards
American music awards
History awards
Education in Rome
Culture in Rome
Fellows of the American Academy in Rome 1991-2010
1990s awards
2000s awards
1991